The men's high jump at the 2010 African Championships in Athletics was held on August 1.

Results

External links
Results

High
High jump at the African Championships in Athletics